Abelardo Fernández Antuña (born 19 April 1970), known simply as Abelardo as a player, is a Spanish former footballer who played as a central defender, currently a manager.

A player with good heading and marking ability, he was also known for a distinctive bald head, a style which he adopted from a relatively young age. During his career he was almost exclusively associated with Sporting de Gijón and Barcelona, having amassed La Liga totals of 385 matches and 24 goals over 14 seasons, and also managed the former club for three years.

Having won more than 50 caps for Spain in one full decade, Abelardo represented the nation in two World Cups and as many European Championships.

Playing career

Club
Born in Gijón, Asturias, Abelardo started his professional career with local Sporting de Gijón, with which he made his La Liga debuts. Signing with FC Barcelona for the 1994–95 season in a 275 million pesetas deal, he was always an important first-team element, helping the Catalans to two leagues, cups and supercups, adding another two European trophies. However, he was greatly hampered by injuries in his final years at the Camp Nou.

Aged 32, Abelardo joined Deportivo Alavés, initially signing a two-year deal but retiring after just one season due to a recurrent knee injury, which had already bothered him at Barcelona.

International
Abelardo made his debut for the Spain national team on 4 September 1991, in a friendly against Uruguay in Oviedo. He went on to appear in a further 53 games and score three goals, being a participant at the 1994 and 1998 FIFA World Cups and UEFA Euro 1996 and 2000.

Abelardo was also an essential member of the squad that won the gold medal at the 1992 Summer Olympics in Barcelona, netting in both the semi-finals (2–0, Ghana) and the final (3–2 over Poland). On 28 December 2002 he played for the Asturias regional team in a friendly against Honduras in Avilés, and scored the opening goal of a 5–3 win.

International goals

Coaching career
Subsequently, Fernández took up coaching, starting with his first club's B-side in 2008. Midway through his second year he was fired, with the team managing to retain their third division status nonetheless. In May 2010, he moved to neighbouring amateurs Candás CF.

Fernández signed for CD Tuilla for the 2011–12 campaign – also in Asturias and the fourth level– winning the Copa Federación de España (Asturias tournament). On 10 February 2012, Sporting Gijón hired him as an assistant coach after Iñaki Tejada was appointed following the departure of Manolo Preciado.

Fernández returned to head coach duties and Sporting B for 2012–13. Late into the following season, he led them to a 4–1 away win over neighbouring Real Oviedo and, one week later, replaced the sacked José Ramón Sandoval at the helm of the main squad. Amidst severe financial problems, he led them to promotion back to the top flight in his first full season, and quit his post in January 2017 due to irreconcilable differences.

On 1 December 2017, Fernández was hired as manager of Alavés, which were placed in the last position in the top division at the date of his arrival. His first game in charge took place three days later, and he led the visitors to a 3–2 away win over Girona FC after they trailed 0–2 with 20 minutes left. In 2018–19, his team started well and were in contention for a Champions League place before fading in the second half to finish 11th, and he resigned at its conclusion.

Fernández returned to the city of Barcelona on 27 December 2019, becoming RCD Espanyol's third coach of the campaign as the side was in last place. Six months later, he was dismissed as the side were eight points from safety with seven games remaining.

On 12 January 2021, Abelardo returned to Alavés in place of the sacked Pablo Machín. On 15 January 2023, he was sacked.

Personal life
Abelardo first met Luis Enrique at the age of 6, and the pair played together for the same junior team, Sporting, Barcelona and Spain.

Managerial statistics

Honours

Player
Barcelona
La Liga: 1997–98, 1998–99
Copa del Rey: 1996–97, 1997–98
Supercopa de España: 1994, 1996
UEFA Cup Winners' Cup: 1996–97
UEFA Super Cup: 1997

Spain U23
Summer Olympic Games: 1992

Manager
Candás
Copa Federación de España (Asturias tournament): 2010

Tuilla
Copa Federación de España (Asturias tournament): 2011

References

External links

1970 births
Living people
Spanish footballers
Footballers from Gijón
Association football defenders
La Liga players
Segunda División B players
Sporting de Gijón B players
Sporting de Gijón players
FC Barcelona players
Deportivo Alavés players
Spain youth international footballers
Spain under-21 international footballers
Spain under-23 international footballers
Spain international footballers
1994 FIFA World Cup players
UEFA Euro 1996 players
1998 FIFA World Cup players
UEFA Euro 2000 players
Footballers at the 1992 Summer Olympics
Olympic footballers of Spain
Olympic medalists in football
Medalists at the 1992 Summer Olympics
Olympic gold medalists for Spain
Spanish football managers
La Liga managers
Segunda División managers
Segunda División B managers
Tercera División managers
Sporting de Gijón managers
Deportivo Alavés managers
RCD Espanyol managers